Fishtrap is an extinct town in Lincoln County, in the U.S. state of Washington. The GNIS classifies it as a populated place.

A post office called Fishtrap was established in 1906 on land owned by John W. Lawton, and remained in operation until 1936.  The community was originally called Vista, but it took its name from the nearby Fishtrap Lake, which was named that because Indians had natural traps to catch fish there. The name was suggested by Mr. Lawton.

The Bureau of Land Management operates the 9,000 acre Fishtrap Recreation Area in the vicinity of the former community. Access to the site is off the Fishtrap exit on Interstate 90, less than a mile northwest of the townsite. The area shows examples of the Channeled Scablands landscape that dominates the area.

References

Ghost towns in Washington (state)
Geography of Lincoln County, Washington